Paulo Martins (born 3 February 1970) is a Portuguese wrestler. He competed in the men's Greco-Roman 74 kg at the 1992 Summer Olympics.

References

External links
 

1970 births
Living people
Portuguese male sport wrestlers
Olympic wrestlers of Portugal
Wrestlers at the 1992 Summer Olympics
People from Porto Santo